Hestina persimilis, the siren, is an East Palearctic species of siren butterfly (Apaturinae) found in western China, Simla to Assam, Orissa. The larva feeds on Celtis australis.

Subspecies
H. p. persimilis (Nepal, Sikkim, Bhutan)
H. p. zella Butler, 1869 (Kashmir)
H. p. chinensis (Leech, 1890) (West China)

References

Apaturinae
Butterflies described in 1850